Eugen Neagoe (born 22 August 1967) is a Romanian football manager and former striker, currently in charge of Liga I club CS Universitatea Craiova. He is the cousin of Victor Pițurcă.

While managing Dinamo București, on 21 July 2019, during the match against Universitatea Craiova, Neagoe suffered a heart attack. He was rushed to the ambulance and resuscitated, then he was taken to Floreasca Hospital where he was stabilised.

Honours

Player
CS Universitatea Craiova 
 Divizia A: 1990–91
 Cupa României: 1990–91, 1992–93
Ferencváros 
 Nemzeti Bajnokság I: 1994–95
 Magyar Kupa: 1994–95
 Szuperkupa: 1994

Omonia Nicosia
 Cypriot Cup runner-up: 1996–97

Extensiv Craiova
 Divizia B: 1998–99

References

External links

1967 births
Living people
People from Dolj County
Romanian footballers
CS Universitatea Craiova players
FC U Craiova 1948 players
FCV Farul Constanța players
FC Dinamo București players
Vasas SC players
Ferencvárosi TC footballers
Alki Larnaca FC players
AC Omonia players
Veria F.C. players
Liga I players
Nemzeti Bajnokság I players
Cypriot First Division players
Super League Greece players
Romanian football managers
Romanian expatriate footballers
Expatriate footballers in Hungary
Expatriate footballers in Cyprus
Expatriate footballers in Greece
Romanian expatriate sportspeople in Hungary
Romanian expatriate sportspeople in Cyprus
Romanian expatriate sportspeople in Greece
FC Steaua București assistant managers
CS Pandurii Târgu Jiu managers
Romanian expatriate football managers
Expatriate football managers in Cyprus
Aris Limassol FC managers
Nea Salamis Famagusta FC managers
Sepsi OSK Sfântu Gheorghe managers
FC Dinamo București managers
FC Hermannstadt managers
FC Astra Giurgiu managers
FC Universitatea Cluj managers
CS Universitatea Craiova managers
FC Politehnica Iași (2010) managers
Liga I managers
Cypriot First Division managers
Association football forwards